Kit Carson County Memorial Hospital is a critical access hospital in Burlington, Colorado, in Kit Carson County. Originally established in 1946, the hospital has 19 beds.

The hospital is part of the Kit Carson County Health Service District, a special district. Other facilities within the district include the Parke Health Center, the Parke Wellness Center, the Stratton Medical Clinic, the Siebert Clinic, and the Kit Carson County Home Health and Caring Hands Service.

The hospital is a Level IV trauma center.

References

External links
Hospital website
 

Hospitals in Colorado
Buildings and structures in Kit Carson County, Colorado
Hospitals established in 1946
1946 establishments in Colorado